The Motor tic, Obsessions and compulsions, Vocal tic Evaluation Survey (MOVES) is a psychological measure used to screen for tics and other behaviors.  It measures "motor tics, vocal tics, obsessions, compulsions, and associated symptoms including echolalia, echopraxia, coprolalia, and copropraxia".

References 

Mental disorders screening and assessment tools
Tourette syndrome